Gião may refer to the following places in Portugal:

Gião (Santa Maria da Feira), a parish in the municipality of Santa Maria da Feira
Gião (Vila do Conde), a parish in the municipality of Vila do Conde